The Top Level Group of UK Parliamentarians for Multilateral Nuclear Disarmament and Non-proliferation (TLG) is a cross-party parliamentary group in the United Kingdom, whose primary focus is the advancement of the nuclear disarmament and non-proliferation agenda in Britain and internationally. It is formed of almost all the former senior Ministers of foreign affairs and defence over the last two decades and includes former Chiefs of Defence and two former NATO Secretaries General.

The Rt Hon Des Browne, former Defence Secretary, was the first convenor of the TLG, which is now led by Alistair Burt MP. The Top Level Group is administered and supported by the European Leadership Network.

Formation
The group was established in October 2009, in response to, and in tandem with, the growing international prominence of the issue of nuclear disarmament and non-proliferation. This momentum has been driven by former US Secretaries of State Henry Kissinger and George Shultz, former Defence Secretary William Perry and former Senator Sam Nunn in their Wall Street Journal article of January 2007, (which has since evolved into the Nuclear Security Project), as well as by U.S. President Barack Obama's Prague speech in April 2009, in which he outlined his vision of a nuclear-free world.

Members

The members of the group are as follows:

Key aims
According to the Top Level Group website, the aims of the group are:

Activities
The members of the group are involved in a variety of activities, engaging in parliamentary work, media contributions, and in various relevant NGO conferences.

In February 2010, the group met with David Miliband MP, then Foreign Secretary, to discuss the issue of nuclear disarmament and non-proliferation, particularly as it related to the Nuclear Non-Proliferation Treaty Review Conference later in the year.

On 14 April 2010, the group produced, signed, and arranged for the signatures of 41 senior European figures for a statement published as an open letter on the Guardian online website. This highlighted the world's growing nuclear dangers and called for greater international efforts to address them.

Des Browne, chair of the group, led delegations to Washington and to Moscow in March and April respectively.

Various members of the group have taken part in video interviews, produced by Talkworks Films, regarding the nuclear options and dangers ahead.

The Top Level Group also maintains a website which provides updates for the activities of its members, and which also monitors and publishes parliamentary proceedings relating to nuclear non-proliferation and disarmament.

References

External links
 Top Level Group
 Nuclear Security Project | Security on Nuclear Weapons & Materials | NTI

Arms control
Arms control treaties
Nuclear proliferation
Nuclear weapons policy
All-Party Parliamentary Groups